Carina Maria Schlebusch is an evolutionary biologist at the University of Uppsala in Sweden. She is a specialist in the population history of Africa. In 2017 she was the co-author of a paper that suggested that modern humans emerged more than 300,000 years ago.

References

Evolutionary biologists
Living people
Academic staff of Uppsala University
Women evolutionary biologists
Year of birth missing (living people)